Gary Woronchak is an American politician and newspaper editor.

Born in Detroit, Michigan, Woronchak graduated from University of Michigan–Dearborn and was the editor for the Dearborn Press & Guide and managing editor of the Daily Tribune in Royal Oak, Michigan. He served in the Michigan House of Representatives from 1999 to  2004 and lived in Dearborn, Michigan. Woronchak then served on the Wayne County, Michigan Board of Commissioners, starting in January 2005 until December 2018. He was Chairman of the Commission from 2011–2018. Woronchak was also executive personal assistance and driver to Robert Ficano, and his number one ally on the commission

References 

1955 births
20th-century American politicians
21st-century American politicians
Living people
Politicians from Detroit
Politicians from Dearborn, Michigan
University of Michigan–Dearborn alumni
Republican Party members of the Michigan House of Representatives
American politicians of Polish descent
County commissioners in Michigan